Robert William Elliott, Baron Elliott of Morpeth,  (11 December 1920 – 20 May 2011) was a British Conservative politician.

The son of Richard Elliott, was a former councillor and mayor of Morpeth, William Elliott was the Conservative Party candidate in the 1954 Morpeth by-election and again for the same constituency in the 1955 General Election, losing on both occasions by over 14,000 votes to the Labour candidate.

He was elected as Member of Parliament for Newcastle upon Tyne North at a by-election in 1957, and held the seat until his retirement at the 1983 general election.

From 1958 Elliott was a Parliamentary Private Secretary (PPS), serving until 1964, when he was appointed an opposition whip, and became a government whip when the Conservatives regained power in 1970.

Elliott was a Vice-Chairman of Conservative Party from 1970 to 1974.  He was knighted in 1974, and became a Deputy Lieutenant of Northumberland in 1982.

On 16 May 1985, he was created a life peer as Baron Elliott of Morpeth, of Morpeth in the County of Northumberland and of the City of Newcastle upon Tyne and took his seat in the House of Lords, where he was Deputy Speaker from 1992 to 2002 and Deputy Chair of Committees from 1997 to 2002.

Arms

References

Sources

External links 
 

1920 births
2011 deaths
People from Morpeth, Northumberland
Conservative Party (UK) life peers
Knights Bachelor
Conservative Party (UK) MPs for English constituencies
UK MPs 1955–1959
UK MPs 1959–1964
UK MPs 1964–1966
UK MPs 1966–1970
UK MPs 1970–1974
UK MPs 1974
UK MPs 1974–1979
UK MPs 1979–1983
Deputy Lieutenants of Northumberland
Life peers created by Elizabeth II